State Route 356 (SR 356) is a primary state highway in the U.S. state of Virginia. Known as Hilliard Road, the state highway runs  from U.S. Route 33 (US 33) in Dumbarton east to SR 161 in Lakeside in central Henrico County.

Route description

SR 356 begins at a four-way intersection with US 33 (Staples Mill Road) just south of Amtrak's Richmond Staples Mill Road station in the community of Dumbarton. The west leg of the intersection is Glenside Drive. The state highway heads east as a five-lane highway with a center left-turn lane and crosses over CSX's RF&P Subdivision, which hosts the Amtrak service. SR 356 heads east through a residential area on the north side of the community of Lakeside. The state highway reaches its eastern terminus at Lakeside Avenue. SR 161 heads south on Lakeside Avenue toward Richmond and east as a continuation of Hilliard Avenue to its northern terminus at US 1. Lakeside Avenue heads north as an unnumbered highway to the Lewis Ginter Botanical Garden.

Major intersections

References

External links

Virginia Highways Project: VA 356

356
State Route 356